Logan Township is one of the fourteen townships of Auglaize County, Ohio, United States. The 2010 census found 1,113 people in the township, 880 of whom lived in the unincorporated portions of the township.

Geography
Located in the northwestern part of the county, it borders the following townships:
Amanda Township, Allen County – north
Shawnee Township, Allen County – northeast
Duchouquet Township – southeast
Moulton Township – south
Noble Township – southwest
Salem Township – west
Spencer Township, Allen County – northwest

The village of Buckland is located in southern Logan Township.

It is crossed in the east by the Auglaize River.

Name and history
It is the only Logan Township statewide.

Formed in 1848 and named for Captain Logan, a noted Shawnee warrior, Logan Township was originally part of Moulton Township and Amanda Township in Allen County.

Government
The township is governed by a three-member board of trustees, who are elected in November of odd-numbered years to a four-year term beginning on the following January 1. Two are elected in the year after the presidential election and one is elected in the year before it. There is also an elected township fiscal officer, who serves a four-year term beginning on April 1 of the year after the election, which is held in November of the year before the presidential election. Vacancies in the fiscal officership or on the board of trustees are filled by the remaining trustees.

Public services
The township is split between the Wapakoneta City School District, the Saint Marys City School District, Spencerville Local Schools, and Shawnee Local Schools.

The eastern and southern sections of the township is served by the Wapakoneta (45895) post office, the northwestern section by the Spencerville (45887) post office, and the northeastern section by the Cridersville (45806) branch of the Lima post office. Buckland (45819) maintains a local post office.

References

External links
Auglaize County website

Townships in Auglaize County, Ohio
Populated places established in 1848
1848 establishments in Ohio
Townships in Ohio